Alessio Di Massimo (born 7 May 1996) is an Italian professional footballer who plays as a winger for  club Ancona.

Club career
Born in Sant'Omero, Di Massimo started his career in local club Sant'omero Palmense on Promozione. He played on loan for Eccellenza Alba Adriatica and Serie D club Avezzano, after joined to Juventus Primavera in 2016.

He left the club in 2016, and joined Pescara.

On 26 July 2016, he moved to Sambenedettese. Di Massimo spent four seasons at the club, and played 112 Serie C matches for Sambenedettese.

On 15 August 2020, he signed with Triestina. 

On 5 October 2020, he was loaned to Catanzaro.

On 31 January 2022, Di Massimo signed a contract with Pistoiese until 2024.

On 12 July 2022, Di Massimo joined Ancona on a two-year contract.

References

External links
 
 

1996 births
Living people
Sportspeople from the Province of Teramo
Footballers from Abruzzo
Italian footballers
Association football wingers
Serie C players
Eccellenza players
Promozione players
Avezzano Calcio players
Delfino Pescara 1936 players
A.S. Sambenedettese players
U.S. Triestina Calcio 1918 players
U.S. Catanzaro 1929 players
U.S. Pistoiese 1921 players
U.S. Ancona 1905 players